Crow Road railway station was located in Glasgow, Scotland and served the Broomhill and Hyndland areas of that city.

On the Lanarkshire and Dunbartonshire Railway it was located on the road from which it took its name and sat to the north of a tunnel which connected it with Partick West railway station. The line ran on to Kelvinside railway station. This route went underneath the present day Hyndland railway station, which opened the day before Crow Road closed, on the present Argyle and North Clyde lines.

Route

References

Notes

Sources
 
 

Disused railway stations in Glasgow
Railway stations in Great Britain opened in 1896
Railway stations in Great Britain closed in 1960
Former Caledonian Railway stations